Gerald Larner (9 March 1936 – 18 December 2018) was a British music critic.
He began his career writing for The Guardian, joining as assistant music critic in 1962 and as chief Northern music critic (1965-93). He wrote for The Times from the 1990s. He composed a libretto for a John McCabe opera and wrote a biography of Maurice Ravel.

His second marriage was to Lynne Walker.

Selected publications
 Glasgow Style (with Celia Larner)
 Maurice Ravel. Phaidon, London, 1996.

References

1936 births
2018 deaths
Writers from Leeds
British music critics
Alumni of New College, Oxford
The Guardian journalists
The Times journalists
Classical music critics
English male journalists
English writers about music
Ravel scholars